The Reverend Friedrich Michael Ziegenhagen (1694 - 24 January 1776) was a German-English clergyman, who worked as a court preacher for the Hanoverian King George I of Great Britain. At the same time, he was a prominent Pietist and one of the most prominent members of the Society for Promoting Christian Knowledge (SPCK).

Life
He was born in Naugard, Prussian Province of Pomerania (modern Nowogard,  Poland) in 1694. In April 1714, he began to study theology at University of Halle where he was influenced by August Hermann Francke. In 1717 he moved to complete his studies at the University of Jena. After finishing his studies he became a private teacher in the home of Count von Platen at Linden near Hanover. In 1722 he was appointed German Lutheran court preacher at the Royal Court in London where he remained for the rest of his life.

Ziegenhagen was connected to Pietists in many European countries. Moreover he maintained contacts between those Pietists and the missions in North America - particularly the community of Salzburgers at Ebenezer, Georgia - and in Southern India (Tranquebar, Madras) where he also supported the Danish-Halle Mission. Due to his religious convictions, Ziegenhagen remained unmarried.

See also
 Society for Promoting Christian Knowledge

References

 Norman J. Threinen: Friedrich Michael Ziegenhagen (1694–1776). German Lutheran Pietist in the English court. In: Lutheran Theological Review. Band 12, 1988, p. 56–94.
 Norman J. Threinen: Friedrich Ziegenhagen. The London Connection to India and America. In: Hans-Jürgen Grabbe (Hrsg.): Halle Pietism, Colonial North America, and the Young United States (USA-Studien Band 15). Stuttgart 2008. p. 113–134.
 Eberhard Fritz: Johann Friedrich Oberlin und die pietistische Bewegung in Straßburg. Zum Einfluss des radikalen Pietismus auf den elsässischen Pfarrer und Sozialreformer. In: Pietismus und Neuzeit 34, 2008, p. 167–188. [Ziegenhagen’s connections with Strasburg, Alsace]
 Christina Jetter-Staib: Halle, England und das Reich Gottes weltweit – Friedrich Michael Ziegenhagen (1694–1776). Hallescher Pietist und Londoner Hofprediger (Hallesche Forschungen, Band 34). Halle 2013.

1694 births
1776 deaths
People from Nowogard
People from the Province of Pomerania
University of Jena alumni
Fellows of All Souls College, Oxford
18th-century German Lutheran clergy